Nils J. Diaz is a former chairman of the Nuclear Regulatory Commission, having worked for the commission between 1996 to 2006. He was the chairman of the commission between 2003 to 2006.

He was a nuclear engineering professor and chairman at the University of Florida in Gainesville, Florida, from the 1970s to the 1990s.  Diaz holds a Ph.D. and M.S. in Nuclear Engineering from the University of Florida, and a B. S. Degree in Mechanical Engineering from the University of Villanova, Havana

After departing the Nuclear Regulatory Commission, he became the Chief Strategic Officer for Blue Castle Project. He is a former paid consultant for Bechtel.

References

External links
Chairman Nils J Diaz, Ph.D. at Nuclear Regulatory Commission

Cuban emigrants to the United States
Heads of United States federal agencies
Nuclear Regulatory Commission officials
University of Florida faculty
University of Florida College of Engineering alumni
Living people
Clinton administration personnel
George W. Bush administration personnel
1938 births